Dancing Girls & Other Stories is a collection of short stories by Canadian author Margaret Atwood, originally published in 1977 by McClelland & Stewart, Toronto. It was the winner of the St. Lawrence Award for Fiction and the award of The Periodical Distributors of Canada for Short Fiction.

The collection's fourteen stories feature ordinary people, including a farmer, a birdwatcher, an author, a mother and a travel agent, and their inevitably biased perceptions of the world.

Stories

Editions based on the original 1977 McClelland & Stewart edition contain the following fourteen stories:
 "The War in the Bathroom"
 "The Man from Mars"
 "Polarities"
 "Under Glass"
 "The Grave of the Famous Poet"
 "Rape Fantasies"
 "Hair Jewellery"
 "When it Happens"
 "A Travel Piece"
 "The Resplendent Quetzal"
 "Training"
 "Lives of the Poets"
 "Dancing Girls"
 "Giving Birth"

Editions based on the revised Simon & Schuster 1982 edition contain the following fourteen stories:
 "The Man from Mars"
 "Betty"
 "Polarities"
 "Under Glass"
 "The Grave of the Famous Poet"
 "Hair Jewellery"
 "When it Happens"
 "A Travel Piece"
 "The Resplendent Quetzal"
 "Training"
 "Lives of the Poets"
 "Dancing Girls"
 "The Sin Eater"
 "Giving Birth"

This effectively swaps "The War in the Bathroom" and "Rape Fantasies" for "Betty" and "The Sin Eater".

References 

1977 short story collections
Short story collections by Margaret Atwood
McClelland & Stewart books